Conrad Kongkal Sangma (born 27 January 1978) is an Indian politician who is the 12th and current Chief Minister of Meghalaya since 2018. He is a member of  National People's Party.  His father was former Chief Minister, former Speaker of the Lok Sabha P. A. Sangma. He was also the Member of Parliament from Tura (2016–2018).He represents the South Tura constituency since 2018 and selsella constituency from 2008 to 2013.Sangma was also minister of finance,power and tourism, Government of Meghalaya from 2008 to 2009.He is former leader of the opposition in the Meghalaya Legislative Assembly.He also served as National President of Nationalist Youth Congress.

Career
Upon completing his studies, Sangma started his political career in the late 1990s, as the campaign manager for his father, P. A. Sangma for the Nationalist Congress Party (NCP). He contested his first election in 2004 losing by 182 votes. He was first elected to the State Assembly along with his brother James, both as NCP members in the 2008 state elections and later held several important portfolios in the state cabinet, including the Finance, Power, Tourism, GAD and IT and presented his first annual budget for Meghalaya within 10 days of debuting as a minister. From 2009 to 2013 Sangma held the post of Leader of Opposition in the Meghalaya Legislative Assembly. In March 2016 he was elected national president of the National People's Party (NPP) following his father's death earlier that year. In May that year, contesting from Tura at the by-election to the Lok Sabha, he won by a record margin of 1.92 lakh votes.

Chief Minister of Meghalaya
Sangma's party, the NPP, came second behind the Indian National Congress winning 19 seats at the 2018 Meghalaya legislative assembly election. Requiring 30 seats to form a government in the State, the NPP allied with other regional parties taking the number to 34. Subsequently, Sangma staked claim to form government upon meeting the Governor of Meghalaya Ganga Prasad with a letter of support from the 34 members of the legislative assembly, that included 19 from NPP, six from United Democratic Party, four from People's Democratic Front, two each from Hill State People's Democratic Party and Bharatiya Janata Party, and an independent, and was declared the Chief Minister-elect. He was sworn in on 6 March, replacing Mukul Sangma who is not related to him. In August 2018, he contested the by-election for the South Tura seat and polled 13,656 votes. Sangma defeated his nearest Congress rival Charlotte W Momin by a margin of over 8,400 votes. He is elected as Meghalaya chief minister again for the second term on 7th March 2023

Personal life
Conrad Sangma was born on 27 January 1978 in Tura, a town in West Garo Hills district, Meghalaya. His father Purno Sangma was a former Chief Minister of Meghalaya and Speaker of the Lok Sabha, and mother Soradini, a homemaker. His siblings, older brother James and younger sister Agatha, are politicians with the NPP. Another sister Christy, however, has remained non-political. Conrad was brought up in Delhi and was educated at the St. Columba's School there. He received a bachelor's degree in business administration in entrepreneurial management from Wharton School of the University of Pennsylvania, before completing his MBA in finance from Imperial College London.

Sangma married Mehtab Chandee, a doctor by profession, on 29 May 2009, and has two daughters with her: Amara (born ) and Kaiyyan (born 2017). Apart from politics, Sangma has been associated with social work, as president of the PA Sangma Foundation, which functions for the betterment in sectors of education and environment, and also runs four colleges in rural Meghalaya. He also currently serves as President of the Meghalaya Cricket Association and Sports Academy.

Conrad Sangma plays the electric guitar and is a fan of the heavy metal band Iron Maiden. In May 2020, he received significant notice for posting on Instagram a video of himself playing the Iron Maiden song "Wasted Years".

References

External links
 Conrad Sangma bioprofile at loksabha.nic.in

|-

1978 births
Living people
Wharton School of the University of Pennsylvania alumni
Alumni of Imperial College London
People from Tura, Meghalaya
Meghalaya MLAs 2008–2013
Meghalaya MLAs 2018–2023
India MPs 2014–2019
National People's Party (India) politicians
Nationalist Congress Party politicians from Meghalaya
Leaders of the Opposition in Meghalaya
State cabinet ministers of Meghalaya
Lok Sabha members from Meghalaya
Garo people